Headlights & Tailpipes is the second studio album by country music singer Willie Mack. It was released on July 17, 2007 by Open Road Recordings and produced by Jason McCoy. "Gonna Get Me a Cadillac," "Don't Waste Your Pretty" and "Golden Years" have all been released as singles.

Track listing
"Gonna Get Me a Cadillac" (Willie Mack, Jason McCoy) - 3:22
"Don't Waste Your Prettty" (Gilles Goddard, Mack) - 2:47
"Golden Years" (Goddard, Wade Kirby, Mack) - 3:49
" " (Kirby, Mack) - 3:32
"You've Gotta Blame Somethin'" (Mack, Johnny Reid) - 3:59
"Headlights & Tailpipes" (Goddard, Mack, Jeff Nystrom) - 3:29
"Another Sky" (Bonnie Baker, Mack) - 3:39
"Love You I Do" (Mack, Steve Mandile) - 3:08
"TGIF" (Randy Branhan, Keith Brown, Mack) - 3:16
"Blacktop Time" (Mack, Chris Thorsteinson, Dave Wasyliw) - 3:12
"Sumpin' Sumpin'" (Branhan, Brown, Mack) - 2:54
"That Was Then This Is Now" (Branhan, Brown, Mack) - 3:10

External links
[ allmusic ((( Headlights and Tailpipes > Overview )))]

2007 albums
Open Road Recordings albums
Willie Mack albums